Eois plumbacea is a moth in the  family Geometridae. It is found on Borneo and the Mentawi Islands. The habitat consists of lowland areas, including dipterocarp forests.

The wings are warm dove grey with slightly darker fasciation.

References

Moths described in 1894
Eois
Moths of Asia